The 2019–20 Miami Heat season was the 32nd season of the franchise in the National Basketball Association (NBA). It was the first time since 2016-17 that Dwyane Wade was not on the Miami Heat roster and the NBA's first time without Wade since 2002-03, as he retired from the NBA after playing 16 years in the league. It was the first season for Jimmy Butler on the Miami Heat.

Jimmy Butler and Bam Adebayo were both selected into 2020 NBA All Star Game.

The season was suspended by the league officials following the games of March 11 after it was reported that Rudy Gobert tested positive for COVID-19.

On June 4, the Heat were one of 22 teams invited to the NBA Bubble.

In the playoffs, the Heat made an unexpectedly deep playoff run by sweeping the Pacers in 4 straight games in first round, then defeated the Bucks who were led by 2020 MVP Giannis in 5 games and got to their Conference Finals for the first time since 2014. In the Eastern Conference Finals, they faced off against the third-seeded Boston Celtics in the two teams' first playoff series since 2012 and defeated Boston in six games, winning the Eastern Conference for the 6th time and reaching the NBA Finals for the first time since 2014, where they were defeated by the Los Angeles Lakers (who were led by former Heat star LeBron James) in 6 games.

Draft picks

Before entering the 2019 NBA draft, the Miami Heat originally only held their lottery selection for the 2019 NBA Draft. On June 19, the night before the draft began, the Heat acquired the Atlanta Hawks' 44th pick of the draft in exchange for a conditional 2024 second round pick and cash considerations. With their sole first round pick of the draft, the Miami Heat selected shooting guard Tyler Herro from the University of Kentucky. On draft night, the Heat agreed to a trade with the Phoenix Suns that saw them obtain the draft rights to forward KZ Okpala from Stanford University. Finally, with the selection the Heat acquired from the Hawks the prior night, Miami selected Sudanese-American center Bol Bol from the University of Oregon. However, the Heat agreed to a trade that sent the draft rights to Bol Bol to the Denver Nuggets for a future conditional second round pick and $1.88 million cash.

Roster

Standings

Division

Conference

Game log

Preseason

|- style="background:#cfc;"
| 1
| October 8
| San Antonio
| 
| Tyler Herro (18)
| Meyers Leonard (11)
| Jimmy Butler (5)
| AmericanAirlines Arena19,600
| 1–0
|- style="background:#cfc;"
| 2
| October 9
| @ Charlotte
| 
| Dion Waiters (19)
| Davon Reed (9)
| Kendrick Nunn (7)
| Spectrum Center8,522
| 2–0
|- style="background:#cfc;"
| 3
| October 14
| Atlanta
| 
| Tyler Herro (23)
| Bam Adebayo (10)
| Dragić, Winslow (5)
| AmericanAirlines Arena19,600
| 3–0
|- style="background:#cfc;"
| 4
| October 17
| @ Orlando
| 
| Jimmy Butler (23)
| Bam Adebayo (13)
| Justise Winslow (12)
| Amway Center17,149
| 4–0
|- style="background:#fcc;"
| 5
| October 18
| Houston
| 
| Kendrick Nunn (40)
| Bam Adebayo (11)
| Goran Dragić (7)
| American Airlines Arena19,600
| 4–1

Regular season

|- style="background:#cfc;"
| 1
| October 23
| Memphis
| 
| Justise Winslow (27)
| Bam Adebayo (11)
| Justise Winslow (7)
| American Airlines Arena19,600
| 1–0
|- style="background:#cfc;"
| 2
| October 26
| @ Milwaukee
| 
| Goran Dragic (25)
| Adebayo, Winslow (13)
| Adebayo, Dragic (8)
| Fiserv Forum17,467
| 2–0
|- style="background:#fcc;"
| 3
| October 27
| @ Minnesota
| 
| Kendrick Nunn (25)
| Bam Adebayo (9)
| Justise Winslow (6)
| Target Center17,049
| 2–1
|- style="background:#cfc;"
| 4
| October 29
| Atlanta
| 
| Tyler Herro (29)
| Adebayo, Leonard (10)
| Adebayo, Dragic, Winslow, Nunn (3)
| American Airlines Arena19,600
| 3–1
|- style="background:#cfc;"
| 5
| October 31
| @ Atlanta
| 
| Kendrick Nunn (28)
| Jimmy Butler (9)
| Jimmy Butler (11)
| State Farm Arena16,539
| 4–1

|- style="background:#cfc;"
| 6
| November 3
| Houston
| 
| Duncan Robinson (23)
| Kelly Olynyk (8)
| Jimmy Butler (9)
| American Airlines Arena19,724
| 5–1
|- style="background:#fcc;"
| 7
| November 5
| @ Denver
| 
| Jimmy Butler (16)
| Bam Adebayo (11)
| Goran Dragic (7)
| Pepsi Center18,010
| 5–2
|- style="background:#cfc;"
| 8
| November 7
| @ Phoenix
| 
| Jimmy Butler (34)
| Bam Adebayo (10)
| Bam Adebayo (6)
| Talking Stick Resort Arena15,498
| 6–2
|- style="background:#fcc;"
| 9
| November 8
| @ L. A. Lakers
| 
| Jimmy Butler (22)
| Bam Adebayo (9)
| Goran Dragic (7)
| Staples Center18,997
| 6–3
|- style="background:#cfc;"
| 10
| November 12
| Detroit
| 
| Butler, Nunn (20)
| Bam Adebayo (14)
| Jimmy Butler (13)
| American Airlines Arena19,600
| 7–3
|- style="background:#cfc;"
| 11
| November 14
| @ Cleveland
| 
| Kendrick Nunn (23)
| Bam Adebayo (15)
| Kendrick Nunn (8)
| Rocket Mortgage FieldHouse17,374
| 8–3
|- style="background:#cfc;"
| 12
| November 16
| New Orleans
| 
| Kendrick Nunn (22)
| Bam Adebayo (14)
| Jimmy Butler (13)
| American Airlines Arena19,600
| 9–3
|- style="background:#cfc;"
| 13
| November 20
| Cleveland
| 
| Duncan Robinson (29)
| Chris Silva (9)
| Dragic, Nunn (6)
| American Airlines Arena19,600
| 10–3
|- style="background:#cfc;"
| 14
| November 22
| @ Chicago
| 
| Jimmy Butler (27)
| Bam Adebayo (14)
| Butler, Dragic (7)
| United Center18,953
| 11–3
|- style="background:#fcc;"
| 15
| November 23
| @ Philadelphia
| 
| Tyler Herro (20)
| Kelly Olynyk (7)
| Butler, Silva (3)
| Wells Fargo Center21,017
| 11–4
|- style="background:#cfc;"
| 16
| November 25
| Charlotte
| 
| Butler, Adebayo (21)
| Kelly Olynyk (16)
| Goran Dragić (9)
| American Airlines Arena19,600
| 12–4
|- style="background:#fcc;"
| 17
| November 27
| @ Houston
| 
| Tyler Herro (22)
| Bam Adebayo (11)
| Bam Adebayo (8)
| Toyota Center18,055
| 12–5
|- style="background:#cfc;"
| 18
| November 29
| Golden State
| 
| Goran Dragić (20)
| Bam Adebayo (9)
| Jimmy Butler (6)
| American Airlines Arena19,600
| 13–5

|- style="background:#cfc;"
| 19
| December 1
| @ Brooklyn
| 
| Goran Dragić (24)
| Bam Adebayo (16)
| Goran Dragić (6)
| Barclays Center17,026
| 14–5
|- style="background:#cfc;"
| 20
| December 3
| @ Toronto
| 
| Butler, Robinson (22)
| Jimmy Butler (13)
| Jimmy Butler (12)
| Scotiabank Arena19,800
| 15–5
|- style="background:#fcc;"
| 21
| December 4
| @ Boston
| 
| Jimmy Butler (37)
| Bam Adebayo (9)
| Butler, Nunn, Winslow (4)
| TD Garden19,156
| 15–6
|- style="background:#cfc;"
| 22
| December 6
| Washington
| 
| Jimmy Butler (28)
| Bam Adebayo (14)
| Jimmy Butler (11)
| American Airlines Arena19,600
| 16–6
|- style="background:#cfc;"
| 23
| December 8
| Chicago
| 
| Tyler Herro (27)
| Bam Adebayo (13)
| Jimmy Butler (7)
| American Airlines Arena19,600
| 17–6
|- style="background:#cfc;"
| 24
| December 10
| Atlanta
| 
| Kendrick Nunn (36)
| Jimmy Butler (18)
| Bam Adebayo (11)
| American Airlines Arena19,600
| 18–6
|- style="background:#fcc;"
| 25
| December 13
| L. A. Lakers
| 
| Jimmy Butler (23)
| Bam Adebayo (12)
| Kendrick Nunn (7)
| American Airlines Arena20,013
| 18–7
|- style="background:#cfc;"
| 26
| December 14
| @ Dallas
| 
| Jimmy Butler (27)
| Bam Adebayo (11)
| Bam Adebayo (10)
| American Airlines Center20,333
| 19–7
|- style="background:#fcc;"
| 27
| December 16
| @ Memphis
| 
| Jimmy Butler (25)
| Bam Adebayo (13)
| Jimmy Butler (8)
| FedExForum14,021
| 19–8
|- style="background:#cfc;"
| 28
| December 18
| @ Philadelphia
| 
| Kendrick Nunn (26)
| Bam Adebayo (9)
| Tyler Herro (7)
| Wells Fargo Center20,715
| 20–8
|- style="background:#cfc;"
| 29
| December 20
| New York
| 
| Bam Adebayo (20)
| Meyers Leonard (13)
| Dragić, Butler (8)
| American Airlines Arena19,704
| 21–8
|- style="background:#cfc;"
| 30
| December 23
| Utah
| 
| Jimmy Butler (20)
| Bam Adebayo (12)
| Bam Adebayo (6)
| American Airlines Arena19,890
| 22–8
|- style="background:#cfc;"
| 31
| December 27
| Indiana
| 
| Jimmy Butler (20)
| Bam Adebayo (15)
| Dragić, Butler, Adebayo (6)
| American Airlines Arena19,767
| 23–8
|- style="background:#cfc;"
| 32
| December 28
| Philadelphia
| 
| Jimmy Butler (25)
| Jimmy Butler (9)
| Jimmy Butler (9)
| American Airlines Arena19,865
| 24–8
|- style="background:#fcc;"
| 33
| December 30
| @ Washington
| 
| Jimmy Butler (27)
| Bam Adebayo (14)
| Bam Adebayo (5)
| Capital One Arena20,476
| 24–9

|- style="background:#cfc;"
| 34
| January 2
| Toronto
| 
| Bam Adebayo (15)
| Bam Adebayo (14)
| Kendrick Nunn (9)
| American Airlines Arena19,939
| 25–9
|- style="background:#fcc;"
| 35
| January 3
| @ Orlando
| 
| Jimmy Butler (23)
| Butler, Adebayo (10)
| Jimmy Butler (7)
| Amway Center17,198
| 25–10
|- style="background:#cfc;"
| 36
| January 5
| Portland
| 
| Goran Dragić (29)
| Meyers Leonard (9)
| Goran Dragić (13)
| American Airlines Arena19,846
| 26–10
|- style="background:#cfc;"
| 37
| January 8
| @ Indiana
| 
| Tyler Herro (19)
| Bam Adebayo (9)
| Jimmy Butler (7)
| Bankers Life Fieldhouse17,040
| 27–10
|- style="background:#fcc;"
| 38
| January 10
| @ Brooklyn
| 
| Jimmy Butler (33)
| Jimmy Butler (9)
| Bam Adebayo (7)
| Barclays Center16,011
| 27–11
|- style="background:#fcc;"
| 39
| January 12
| @ New York
| 
| Jimmy Butler (25)
| Jimmy Butler (10)
| Jimmy Butler (6)
| Madison Square Garden18,861
| 27–12
|- style="background:#cfc;"
| 40
| January 15
| San Antonio
| 
| Kendrick Nunn (33)
| Bam Adebayo (13)
| Bam Adebayo (7)
| American Airlines Arena19,704
| 28–12
|- style="background:#cfc;"
| 41
| January 17
| @ Oklahoma City
| 
| Kendrick Nunn (22)
| Jimmy Butler (10)
| Jimmy Butler (7)
| Chesapeake Energy Arena18,203
| 29–12
|- style="background:#fcc;"
| 42
| January 19
| @ San Antonio
| 
| Bam Adebayo (21)
| Bam Adebayo (16)
| Butler, Adebayo (6)
| AT&T Center18,422
| 29–13
|- style="background:#cfc;"
| 43
| January 20
| Sacramento
| 
| Kendrick Nunn (22)
| Bam Adebayo (11)
| Kendrick Nunn (6)
| American Airlines Arena19,600
| 30–13
|- style="background:#cfc;"
| 44
| January 22
| Washington
| 
| Tyler Herro (25)
| Bam Adebayo (8)
| Jimmy Butler (10)
| American Airlines Arena19,600
| 31–13
|- style="background:#fcc;"
| 45
| January 24
| L. A. Clippers
| 
| Jimmy Butler (20)
| Kelly Olynyk (9)
| Bam Adebayo (9)
| American Airlines Arena19,632
| 31–14
|- style="background:#cfc;"
| 46
| January 27
| Orlando
| 
| Duncan Robinson (21)
| Bam Adebayo (10)
| Bam Adebayo (10)
| American Airlines Arena19,600
| 32–14
|- style="background:#fcc;"
| 47
| January 28
| Boston
| 
| Goran Dragić (23)
| Bam Adebayo (10)
| Goran Dragić (4)
| American Airlines Arena19,704
| 32–15

|- style="background:#cfc;"
| 48
| February 1
| @ Orlando
| 
| Jimmy Butler (24)
| Adebayo, Leonard (14)
| Goran Dragić (6)
| Amway Center18,846
| 33–15
|- style="background:#cfc;"
| 49
| February 3
| Philadelphia
| 
| Jimmy Butler (38)
| Bam Adebayo (8)
| Bam Adebayo (11)
| American Airlines Arena19,725
| 34–15
|- style="background:#fcc;"
| 50
| February 5
| @ L. A. Clippers
| 
| Derrick Jones Jr. (25)
| Bam Adebayo (11)
| Jimmy Butler (7)
| Staples Center19,068
| 34–16
|- style="background:#fcc;"
| 51
| February 7
| @ Sacramento
| 
| Bam Adebayo (26)
| Bam Adebayo (7)
| Duncan Robinson (6)
| Golden 1 Center16,760
| 34–17
|- style="background:#fcc;"
| 52
| February 9
| @ Portland
| 
| Goran Dragić (27)
| Bam Adebayo (12)
| Adebayo, Dragić (7)
| Moda Center19,726
| 34–18
|- style="background:#cfc;"
| 53
| February 10
| @ Golden State
| 
| Butler, Crowder (21)
| Bam Adebayo (11)
| Kelly Olynyk (11)
| Chase Center18,064
| 35–18
|- style="background:#fcc;"
| 54
| February 12
| @ Utah
| 
| Jimmy Butler (25)
| Bam Adebayo (11)
| Adebayo, Dragić (5)
| Vivint Smart Home Arena18,306
| 35–19
|- style="background:#fcc;"
| 55
| February 20
| @ Atlanta
| 
| Bam Adebayo (28)
| Bam Adebayo (19)
| Jimmy Butler (9)
| State Farm Arena17,356
| 35–20
|- style="background:#cfc;"
| 56
| February 22
| Cleveland
| 
| Kendrick Nunn (24)
| Udonis Haslem (5)
| Bam Adebayo (9)
| American Airlines Arena19,754
| 36–20
|- style="background:#fcc;"
| 57
| February 24
| @ Cleveland
| 
| Adebayo, Dragić (22)
| Bam Adebayo (13)
| Bam Adebayo (9)
| Rocket Mortgage FieldHouse17,336
| 36–21
|- style="background:#fcc;"
| 58
| February 26
| Minnesota
| 
| Kendrick Nunn (24)
| Bam Adebayo (10)
| Jimmy Butler (9)
| American Airlines Arena19,600
| 36–22
|- style="background:#cfc;"
| 59
| February 28
| Dallas
| 
| Jimmy Butler (26)
| Bam Adebayo (11)
| Kelly Olynyk (9)
| American Airlines Arena19,704
| 37–22
|- style="background:#cfc;"
| 60
| February 29
| Brooklyn
| 
| Kendrick Nunn (21)
| Bam Adebayo (12)
| Goran Dragić (10)
| American Airlines Arena19,600
| 38–22

|- style="background:#cfc;"
| 61
| March 2
| Milwaukee
| 
| Butler, Crowder (18)
| Bam Adebayo (13)
| Jimmy Butler (7)
| American Airlines Arena19,600
| 39–22
|- style="background:#cfc;"
| 62
| March 4
| Orlando
| 
| Duncan Robinson (27)
| Adebayo, Butler, Crowder (7)
| Goran Dragić (9)
| American Airlines Arena19,600
| 40–22
|- style="background:#fcc;"
| 63
| March 6
| @ New Orleans
| 
| Jimmy Butler (28)
| Bam Adebayo (12)
| Jimmy Butler (6)
| Smoothie King Center18,384
| 40–23
|- style="background:#cfc;"
| 64
| March 8
| @ Washington
| 
| Bam Adebayo (27)
| Bam Adebayo (14)
| Bam Adebayo (6)
| Capital One Arena18,135
| 41–23
|- style="background:#fcc;"
| 65
| March 11
| Charlotte
| 
| Kendrick Nunn (24)
| Jae Crowder (10)
| Bam Adebayo (10)
| American Airlines Arena19,600
| 41–24

|- style="background:#cfc;"
| 66
| August 1
| @ Denver
| 
| Adebayo, Butler (22)
| Bam Adebayo (9)
| Jimmy Butler (7)
| HP Field HouseNo In-Person Attendance
| 42–24
|- style="background:#fcc;"
| 67
| August 3
| Toronto
| 
| Goran Dragić (25)
| Bam Adebayo (8)
| Butler, Dragić, Iguodala (5)
| HP Field HouseNo In-Person Attendance
| 42–25
|- style="background:#cfc;"
| 68
| August 4
| Boston
| 
| Adebayo, Robinson (21)
| Bam Adebayo (12)
| Kelly Olynyk (8)
| HP Field HouseNo In-Person Attendance
| 43–25
|- style="background:#fcc;"
| 69
| August 6
| @ Milwaukee
| 
| Duncan Robinson (21)
| Andre Iguodala (7)
| Andre Iguodala (8)
| The ArenaNo In-Person Attendance
| 43–26
|- style="background:#fcc;"
| 70
| August 8
| Phoenix
| 
| Herro, Robinson (25)
| Herro, Olynyk (8)
| Tyler Herro (10)
| Visa Athletic CenterNo In-Person Attendance
| 43–27
|- style="background:#cfc;"
| 71
| August 10
| Indiana
| 
| Jimmy Butler (19)
| Jimmy Butler (11)
| Goran Dragić (9)
| Visa Athletic CenterNo In-Person Attendance
| 44–27
|- style="background:#fcc;"
| 72
| August 12
| @ Oklahoma City
| 
| Tyler Herro (30)
| Tyler Herro (6)
| Goran Dragić (6)
| Visa Athletic CenterNo In-Person Attendance
| 44–28
|- style="background:#fcc;"
| 73
| August 14
| @ Indiana
| 
| Kendrick Nunn (23)
| Chris Silva (11)
| Kendrick Nunn (4)
| The ArenaNo In-Person Attendance
| 44–29

|- style="background:#;"
| 66
| March 13
| New York
| 
|
|
|
| American Airlines Arena
|
|- style="background:#;"
| 67
| March 14
| Chicago
| 
|
|
|
| American Airlines Arena
|
|- style="background:#;"
| 68
| March 16
| @ Milwaukee
| 
|
|
|
| Fiserv Forum
|
|- style="background:#;"
| 69
| March 18
| @ Chicago
| 
|
|
|
| United Center
|
|- style="background:#;"
| 70
| March 20
| @ Indiana
| 
|
|
|
| Bankers Life Fieldhouse
|
|- style="background:#;"
| 71
| March 23
| Oklahoma City
| 
|
|
|
| American Airlines Arena
|
|- style="background:#;"
| 72
| March 25
| Denver
| 
|
|
|
| American Airlines Arena
|
|- style="background:#;"
| 73
| March 28
| Phoenix
| 
|
|
|
| American Airlines Arena
|
|- style="background:#;"
| 74
| March 30
| @ Charlotte
| 
|
|
|
| Spectrum Center
|
|- style="background:#;"
| 75
| April 1
| @ Boston
| 
|
|
|
| TD Garden
|
|- style="background:#;"
| 76
| April 3
| @ Detroit
| 
|
|
|
| Little Caesars Arena
|
|- style="background:#;"
| 77
| April 5
| @ New York
| 
|
|
|
| Madison Square Garden
|
|- style="background:#;"
| 78
| April 7
| Indiana
| 
|
|
|
| American Airlines Arena
|
|- style="background:#;"
| 79
| April 9
| Detroit
| 
|
|
|
| American Airlines Arena
|
|- style="background:#;"
| 80
| April 11
| Boston
| 
|
|
|
| American Airlines Arena
|
|- style="background:#;"
| 81
| April 13
| @ Charlotte
| 
|
|
|
| Spectrum Center
|
|- style="background:#;"
| 82
| April 14
| Toronto
| 
|
|
|
| American Airlines Arena
|

Playoffs 

|- style="background:#cfc;"
| 1
| August 18
| @ Indiana
| 
| Jimmy Butler (28)
| Bam Adebayo (10)
| Bam Adebayo (6)
| AdventHealth ArenaNo in-person attendance
| 1–0
|- style="background:#cfc;"
| 2
| August 20
| @ Indiana
| 
| Duncan Robinson (24)
| Jae Crowder (8)
| Butler, Dragić (8)
| The Field HouseNo in-person attendance
| 2–0
|- style="background:#cfc;"
| 3
| August 22
| Indiana
| 
| Jimmy Butler (27)
| Bam Adebayo (11)
| Goran Dragić (6)
| AdventHealth ArenaNo in-person attendance
| 3–0
|- style="background:#cfc;"
| 4
| August 24
| Indiana
| 
| Goran Dragić (23)
| Bam Adebayo (19)
| Bam Adebayo (6)
| The Field HouseNo in-person attendance
| 4–0

|- style="background:#cfc;"
| 1
| August 31
| @ Milwaukee
| 
| Jimmy Butler (40)
| Bam Adebayo (17)
| Bam Adebayo (6)
| HP Field HouseNo in-person attendance
| 1–0
|- style="background:#cfc;"
| 2
| September 2
| @ Milwaukee
| 
| Goran Dragić (23)
| Bam Adebayo (9)
| Jimmy Butler (6)
| HP Field HouseNo in-person attendance
| 2–0
|- style="background:#cfc;"
| 3
| September 4
| Milwaukee
| 
| Jimmy Butler (30)
| Bam Adebayo (16)
| Jimmy Butler (6)
| HP Field HouseNo in-person attendance
| 3–0
|- style="background:#fcc;"
| 4
| September 6
| Milwaukee
| 
| Bam Adebayo (26)
| Bam Adebayo (12)
| Adebayo, Dragić (8)
| AdventHealth ArenaNo in-person attendance
| 3–1
|- style="background:#cfc;"
| 5
| September 8
| @ Milwaukee
| 
| Butler, Dragić (17)
| Jimmy Butler (10)
| Butler, Herro (6)
| HP Field HouseNo in-person attendance
| 4–1

|- style="background:#cfc;"
| 1
| September 15
| @ Boston
| 
| Goran Dragić (29)
| Tyler Herro (11)
| Adebayo, Herro (9)
| HP Field HouseNo in-person attendance
| 1–0
|- style="background:#cfc;"
| 2
| September 17
| @ Boston
| 
| Goran Dragić (25)
| Bam Adebayo (10)
| Dragić, Herro (5)
| AdventHealth ArenaNo in-person attendance
| 2–0
|- style="background:#fcc;"
| 3
| September 19
| Boston
| 
| Bam Adebayo (27)
| Bam Adebayo (16)
| Crowder, Dragić (5)
| AdventHealth ArenaNo in-person attendance
| 2–1
|- style="background:#cfc;"
| 4
| September 23
| Boston
| 
| Tyler Herro (37)
| Bam Adebayo (12)
| Bam Adebayo (4)
| AdventHealth ArenaNo in-person attendance
| 3–1
|- style="background:#fcc;"
| 5
| September 25
| @ Boston
| 
| Goran Dragić (23)
| Adebayo, Butler (8)
| Adebayo, Butler (8)
| AdventHealth ArenaNo in-person attendance
| 3–2
|- style="background:#cfc;"
| 6
| September 27
| Boston
| 
| Bam Adebayo (32)
| Bam Adebayo (14)
| Jimmy Butler (8)
| AdventHealth ArenaNo in-person attendance
| 4–2

|- style="background:#fcc;"
| 1
| September 30
| @ L. A. Lakers
| 
| Jimmy Butler (23)
| Iguodala, Nunn, Olynyk (5)
| Andre Iguodala (6)
| The ArenaNo In-Person Attendance
| 0–1
|- style="background:#fcc;"
| 2
| October 2
| @ L. A. Lakers
| 
| Jimmy Butler (25)
| Kelly Olynyk (9)
| Jimmy Butler (13)
| The ArenaNo In-Person Attendance
| 0–2
|- style="background:#cfc;"
| 3
| October 4
| L. A. Lakers
| 
| Jimmy Butler (40)
| Jimmy Butler (11)
| Jimmy Butler (12)
| The ArenaNo In-Person Attendance
| 1–2
|- style="background:#fcc;"
| 4
| October 6
| L. A. Lakers
| 
| Jimmy Butler (22)
| Jimmy Butler (10)
| Jimmy Butler (9)
| The ArenaNo In-Person Attendance
| 1–3
|- style="background:#cfc;"
| 5
| October 9
| @ L. A. Lakers
| 
| Jimmy Butler (35)
| Jimmy Butler (12)
| Jimmy Butler (11)
| The ArenaNo In-Person Attendance
| 2–3
|- style="background:#fcc;"
| 6
| October 11
| L. A. Lakers
| 
| Bam Adebayo (25)
| Bam Adebayo (10)
| Jimmy Butler (8)
| The ArenaNo In-Person Attendance
| 2–4

Transactions

Trades

Free agents

Re-signed

Additions

Subtractions

References

Miami Heat seasons
Miami Heat
Miami Heat
Miami Heat
Eastern Conference (NBA) championship seasons